Michel Creton (17 August 1942 in Wassy, Haute-Marne, France) is a French actor.

He came to international attention with the release of Un homme de trop (Shock Troops) by Costa Gavras in 1967. Since then, he played in many films, appeared on TV and on stage (for example in 1989 in Un fil à la patte de Georges Feydeau in Théâtre du Palais-Royal in Paris). While he was in cinema a supporting actor, as one of Bernard Fresson's friends in Max an the junkmen, and mostly rare in major roles like his thief in Nicholas Gessner's Le tuer triste, he was a leading man on TV: alongside to Claude Jade in Fou comme François. For his second TV movie with Claude Jade, Treize, he was the writer of the screenplay.

Selected filmography 

1967: Love in the Night by Marcel Camus, with Serge Gainsbourg
1968: Un homme de trop (Shock Troops) by Costa-Gavras, with Jacques Perrin
1968: Le Bourgeois Gentilhomme by Bernarde Borderie, with Michel Serrault (Covielle)
1969: La Voie lactée (The Milky Way) by Luis Buñuel
1970: Béru und jene Damen by Guy Lefranc, with Gérard Barray
1971: Max et les ferrailleurs (Max and the junkmen) by Claude Sautet
1971: Un meurtre est un meurtre (A Murder Is a Murder... Is a Murder by Étienne Périer, with Stéphane Audran
1971: La Dame de Monsoreau by Yannick Andrei, (Chicot)
1973: Au rendez-vous de la mort joyeuse (At the Meeting with Joyous Death), by Juan Luis Buñuel
1973: Le Dingue by Daniel Daert, with Christian Baltauss
1974: Impossible Is Not French with Robert Lamoureux
1975: Au-delà de la peur (Beyond Fear) by Yannick Andréi, with Michel Bouquet
1976: La Fleur des pois by Raymond Rouleau, with Nicole Jamet
1976: Les beaux messieurs de Bois-Doré (The Gallant Lords of Bois-Doré) by Bernard Borderie
1977: Armaguedon by Alain Jessua, with Alain Delon, Jean Yanne
1977: Monsieur Papa by Philippe Monnier, with Claude Brasseur and Nathalie Baye
1978: Les Bronzés (French Fried Vacation) by Patrice Leconte, with Josiane Balasko
1978: Fou comme François by Gérard Chouchan, with Claude Jade
1981: Treize (13) by Patrick Villechaize, with Claude Jade
1981: Psy by Philippe de Broca, with Dewaere, Anny Duperey
1982: Le Crime de Pierre Lacaze (The Crime of Pierre Lacaze) by Jean Delannoy
1983: Le Grand carnaval by Alexandre Arcady, with Philippe Noiret
1983: Julien Fontanes, magistrat by Serge Friedman
1984: Les Morfalous by Henri Verneuil, with Jean-Paul Belmondo
1985: Le Tueur triste by Nicolas Gessner, with Edwige Feuillère
1986: Tenue de soirée by Bertrand Blier, with Gérard Depardieu
1987: Le Solitaire (The Loner) by Jacques Deray, with Jean-Paul Belmondo
1988: À gauche en sortant de l'ascenseur, by Édouard Molinaro, with Pierre Richard, Emmanuelle Béart and Richard Bohringer
1990: Il y a des jours... et des lunes by Claude Lelouch
1997: Soleil by Roger Hanin, with Sophia Loren, Philippe Noiret
2005: Mis en bouteille a château by Marion Sarraut (TV)

External links 
 
 Michel Creton's foto at russian forum about Alexandre Dumas

1942 births
Living people
French male stage actors
French male film actors
French male television actors